Jan Baz Khan is a citizen of Afghanistan who allegedly turned over innocent men to American troops in the beginning of the war in Afghanistan.

One of the detainees who were beaten to death at Bagram was a taxi driver named Dilawar.
A May 20, 2005 article in the New York Times reports that 
Dilawar was captured by troops loyal to Jan Baz Khan the "guerrilla commander" guarded Firebase Salerno, shortly after three rockets were fired at the base.
American troops beat Dilawar to death on December 10, 2002, five days after he arrived at Bagram.
According to the article, by February 2003, Bagram intelligence analysts concluded that Jan Baz was handing over innocent men to garner American approval, and that he was behind the rocket attack himself.

References

External links
When Torture Kills: Ten Murders In US Prisons In Afghanistan Andy Worthington

Afghan politicians
Bagram Theater Internment Facility detainees
Living people
Year of birth missing (living people)